Sasstown Airport  is an airport serving Sasstown in Liberia.

Airports in Liberia